Northcountry Cooperative Development Fund (NCDF) is a cooperatively owned community-development loan fund committed to fostering economic democracy by investing in cooperative enterprises.  Based in Minneapolis, Minnesota, NCDF currently serves more than 170 owner-members in 30 states, including natural food, consumer, producer, housing and worker-owned cooperatives.

A federally certified Community Development Finance Institution (CDFI), NCDF creates opportunities for cooperatives and social investors to invest in the national cooperative movement, with an emphasis on community development within economically challenged and underserved communities. Since its founding in 1978, NCDF has originated over $31 million in cooperative financing.

References

External links
  Name changed to 'Shared Capital Cooperative' and website changed.

Cooperatives in the United States